Loma Linda University Medical Center (LLUMC) is an academic hospital in California's Inland Empire region. Opened more than 100 years ago, it has a trauma center that admits over one million patients yearly, around 900 faculty physicians and over 1,000 beds.

The main tower of the center was built in 1967 and is 18 stories high. Currently, the hospital is building two new hospital towers. It is one of the tallest buildings in the Inland Empire. Because of its height and white coloration, it is possible to view the main hospital building from various locations around the San Bernardino valley and mountains.

Loma Linda University Medical Center made international news on October 26, 1984, when Dr. Leonard L. Bailey transplanted a baboon heart into Baby Fae, an infant born with a severe heart defect known as hypoplastic left heart syndrome. Baby Fae died a few weeks later; however, this effort led to the successful infant heart transplant program, with transplantation of human-to-human infant transplants. LLUMC is home to the Venom E.R., which specializes in snake bites. In 2014, LLUMC was ranked the 14th best hospital in California by the U.S. News & World Report.

Loma Linda University

Loma Linda University Medical Center is the teaching hospital for Loma Linda University, which includes schools of medicine, nursing, pharmacy, dentistry, allied health, religion, public health, and behavioral health.

Children's hospital

Loma Linda University Children's Hospital is the sole children's hospital for almost 1.3 million of California's youth (San Bernardino, Riverside, Inyo, and Mono Counties). The hospital provides comprehensive pediatric specialties and subspecialties to infants, children, teens, and young adults aged 0–21 throughout the region.

Surgical hospital

In May 2008, it was announced that LLUMC had been in talks since December and had finalized a buyout of the 28-bed California Heart and Surgical Center located approximately two miles east of the main campus on the border of Loma Linda and Redlands, California. This was a marked departure of their previous position of opposition to the facility when it was first proposed in 2005. The Heart and Surgical Center would have been a for-profit facility while the Loma Linda is a non-profit facility and it was feared by area hospitals, including Loma Linda, that the Heart and Surgical Center would take all the paying patients. However, Loma Linda finalized the construction and furnishing of the center and in January 2009, they received state approval to open and begin operations as  Loma Linda University Heart & Surgical Hospital. The daVinci Robot that was operated at the Medical Center to perform minimally invasive robotic surgeries was moved to the Surgical Hospital. The hospital is now known as Loma Linda University Surgical Hospital, when heart operations were moved to the main medical center.

Seismic upgrade project

The main hospital building is currently undergoing a seismic upgrade project. It is being headed by Turner Construction Company of New York, NY. The project includes reinforcing the main building to bring it up to California state standards.

Controversy

Medicare lawsuits

In 2004, Loma Linda University Behavioral Medicine Center paid 2.2 million dollars to settle a federal lawsuit that the organization had over-billed federal health insurance programs. The lawsuit alleged that its billing service had prepared two different cost reports, one for internal use and an inflated one to bill Medicare.

In 2005, a group of 20 physician corporations paid  to settle a federal lawsuit over fraudulent Medicare billings reviewed under the Physicians at Teaching Hospitals (PaTH) initiative. The lawsuit alleged that the hospital had been billing Medicare for procedures done by residents and interns as if they had been done by the attending physicians.

See also

 List of Seventh-day Adventist hospitals
 List of hospitals in California

References

External links
 
 Proton Treatment Center
 This hospital in the CA Healthcare Atlas A project by OSHPD

Hospital buildings completed in 1905
Hospital buildings completed in 1967
Hospitals established in 1905
Hospitals in San Bernardino County, California
Loma Linda, California
Medical Center
Teaching hospitals in California
Hospitals affiliated with the Seventh-day Adventist Church
1905 establishments in California
Trauma centers